Kazlauskas (feminine forms of this family name - Kazlauskaitė, Kazlauskienė) is the most common surname in Lithuania. It may refer to:

Charles Kazlauskas (b. 1982), American association football player of Lithuanian descent
Donatas Kazlauskas (b. 1994), Lithuanian footballer
Jonas Kazlauskas (b. 1954), Lithuanian professional basketball coach and player
Jonas Kazlauskas (b. 1930), Lithuanian linguist, expert on Baltic languages
Marius Kazlauskas (b. 1984), Lithuanian football player
Nomeda Kazlaus (Kazlauskaitė), Lithuanian dramatic soprano
Valdas Kazlauskas (b. 1958), Lithuanian race-walker

Lithuanian-language surnames